The Dutch Research Council (NWO, Dutch: Nederlandse Organisatie voor Wetenschappelijk Onderzoek) is the national research council of the Netherlands. NWO funds thousands of top researchers at universities and institutes and steers the course of Dutch science by means of subsidies and research programmes. NWO promotes quality and innovation in science. NWO is an independent administrative body under the auspices of the Dutch Ministry of Education, Culture and Science. NWO directs its approximate budget of 1 billion euros towards Dutch universities and institutes, often on a project basis. Also, NWO has its own research institutes and facilitates international cooperation. Current president of NWO since April 1st, 2021 is Marcel Levi. Former NWO presidents include Stan Gielen, Peter Nijkamp and Jos Engelen.

NWO is also known for the annual Spinoza and Stevin Prizes.

History
The council was established in 1950 as Nederlandse Organisatie voor Zuiver-Wetenschappelijk Onderzoek (ZWO). This organisation did not focus on applied research; the research organization TNO was established for that purpose. In 1988 ZWO was renamed as NWO and was given the broader mission. Like its predecessor, NWO is a public institution; its tasks and responsibilities are established in the NWO Act. On 1 January 2018 the former FOM institutes AMOLF, ARCNL, DIFFER and Nikhef and the over 200 university workgroups from the former FOM projects merged with the other NWO institutes (NWO-I): ASTRON, CWI, NIOZ, NSCR and SRON.

NWO signed the Berlin Declaration on Open Access to Knowledge in the Sciences and Humanities in May 2005.

NWO organisation

NWO Domains
NWO's core task is performed in the NWO domains, research institutes and regional bodies: encouraging quality and innovation in the sciences. The NWO domains organise the programmes and the research funding. Both the Executive Board and the NWO Domain Boards have the competence to allocate public funding for scientific research.

 NWO Domain Science (ENW) 
 NWO Domain Applied and Engineering Sciences (AES)
 NWO Domain Social Sciences and Humanities (SSH)
Health Research and Development is managed by ZonMw. WOTRO Science for Global Development is a domain intersecting initiative.

NWO-I, Institutes Organisation of NWO 
NWO-I, the Institutes Organisation of NWO, works closely with the NWO domains and encompasses 9 institutes.  The office of NWO-I supports all institutes.

 AMOLF Institute for Atomic and Molecular Physics
 Advanced Research Center for Nanolithography (ARCNL)
ASTRON Netherlands Institute for Radio Astronomy
Centrum Wiskunde & Informatica (CWI)
DIFFER (Dutch Institute for Fundamental Energy Research)
Nikhef Dutch National Institute for Subatomic Physics
Royal Netherlands Institute of Sea Research (NIOZ)
Netherlands Institute for the Study of Crime and Law Enforcement (NSCR)
SRON Netherlands Institute for Space Research

The institute Data Archiving and Networked Services (DANS, in cooperation with KNAW) and Netherlands eScience Center, in cooperation with SURF are also part of NWO.

Temporary Task Forces
The Temporary Task Forces have a semi-permanent status. They collaborate with industry experts in order to accelerate the development of promising technologies. 
National Initiative Brain & Cognition (NIHC)
Netherlands Initiative for Education Research (NRO)
Taskforce for Applied Research (NRPO-SIA)

See also
Royal Netherlands Academy of Arts and Sciences (KNAW) 
Netherlands Organisation for Applied Scientific Research (TNO)
 Open access in the Netherlands

References

External links
NWO website

 (Den Haag)

Research institutes in the Netherlands
Science and technology in the Netherlands
Organisations based in The Hague
Scientific organizations established in 1950
1950 establishments in the Netherlands
Research funding agencies